Elvehøj (Elf Hill) is the Danish name of a Scandinavian ballad (Danmarks gamle folkeviser no. 46), known in Swedish as Älvefärd (Sveriges medeltida ballader no. 31), type A 65 ('knight released from elves at dawn') in The Types of the Scandinavian Medieval Ballad; it is also attested in Norwegian.

Summary 
The ballad is in the first person. The narrator, an attractive young man, falls asleep beside an elf-mound (or elvehøj). Some women (usually elf-maidens) then attempt to woo the narrator, singing so beautifully that the natural world responds (the streams stop flowing, fish dance for joy, etc., depending on the variant). The narrator, however, resists their blandishments, grasping his sword (usually in silence). The man is most often rescued by the crowing of a cock awaking him, though in the Danish A-version, from the mid-sixteenth-century Jens Billes visebog (known to Grundtvig as 'Sten Bille’s Haandskrift'), he is saved by the advice of his sister who, previously enchanted, is one of the elf-maidens. The ballad usually ends with moralising advice to the listeners.

The following table, by Lynda Taylor, charts the differences between the main versions.

Manuscripts 
DgF includes three main variants of ‘'Elvehøj'’, one of which survives in several near-identical copies. There are three versions in Sveriges medeltida ballader: two (A and C) are complete, with eight four-line stanzas each, while the B-version is fragmentary, with only four stanzas. Each one is very different from the others. A is the oldest Swedish version, collected in the 1670s from a farmer’s wife in Västergötland; C was collected in Östergötland in the 1840s.

Translations

 German by Herder (1774) (this translation translated into English by Lewis (1801))
 Scots by Robert Jamieson, 'Elfer Hill', in Popular Ballads and Songs from Tradition, Manuscripts, and Scarce Editions; with Translations of Similar Pieces from the Ancient Danish Language and a Few Originals by the Editor, Volume I (Edinburgh: Constable, 1806), pp. 225-28.

Analogues and influence 
The ballad can be seen as a 'happy ending' version of the much more famous Elveskud. The story is also similar to the ballads Herr Magnus och havsfrun, SMB 26, and Jungfrurnas gäst, SMB 30.

H. C. Andersen wrote a fairy tale called 'Elverhøi' in 1845, 'and the celebrated elfin mound has now become a tourist spot in Stevns Peninsula, Denmark.

The ballad was one of the inspirations for the 1828 patriotic play Elverhøj (Elves' Hill) by Johan Ludvig Heiberg. Elverhøj is still a popular play in Denmark.

In popular culture 

 Norwegian singer Helene Bøksle used part of the text of the ballad as lyrics for her song Elverhøy.
 French neofolk band SKÁLD used part of the text of the ballad as lyrics for their single Elverhøy, from their 2023 album Huldufólk.

See also
 Siren

Further reading
Leif Jonsson, Ann-Marie Nilsson & Greger Andersson, Musiken i Sverige. Från forntid till stormaktstidens slut 1720 (1994)
Lynda Taylor, 'The Cultural Significance of Elves in Northern European Balladry' (unpublished PhD thesis, The University of Leeds, 2014), pp. 137-47

References

Scandinavian folklore
Danish folklore
Swedish folklore
Norwegian folklore
Folk ballads
Songs
Folk
Danish folk music
Nordic folk music
Norwegian folk music